"The Siren" is the fourth and last single of Finnish symphonic metal band Nightwish's fifth studio album Once. The song was recorded with the London Session Orchestra and includes many exotic instruments, for example an electric violin and a sitar; it also has very few lines.

"Symphony of Destruction", a live cover included on the single, was originally performed by Megadeth on their album Countdown to Extinction.

The song was performed with previous frontwoman, Anette Olzon, and on 19 September 2009, at the Hartwall Areena, the band was supported by two cellists from the Finnish Cello rock band Apocalyptica.

Track listing

Spinefarm Records
 The Siren (edited)
 The Siren (album version)
 The Siren (live)
 Kuolema tekee taiteilijan (live)

Nuclear Blast Records
 The Siren (edited)
 The Siren (album version)
 The Siren (live)
 Symphony of Destruction (live)
 Kuolema Tekee Taiteilijan (live)

Nems Enterprises
 The Siren (edited)
 The Siren
 The Siren (live)
Bonus tracks:
 Creek Mary' s Blood (orch. istr. score)
 Symphony of Destruction (live)

Chart performance
The Siren reached th 59th place in the Swiss charts, 51st in the German charts, 30th in Swedish the charts, third in the Finnish charts and fifteenth in the Danish charts.

References

Nightwish songs
Male–female vocal duets
2005 singles
2004 songs
Songs written by Tuomas Holopainen
Songs written by Emppu Vuorinen
Spinefarm Records singles